Don Valley West is a provincial electoral district in Toronto, Ontario, Canada. It elects one member to the Legislative Assembly of Ontario.

It was created in 1999 from parts of Don Mills, York Mills, York East and Eglinton.

The riding was particularly notable in the 2007 election because John Tory, who at the time was leader of the Progressive Conservative Party of Ontario, was defeated by his Liberal opponent Kathleen Wynne. In February 2013, Wynne became Premier of Ontario.

Boundaries
When the riding was created, it included all of Metro Toronto within the following line: Highway 401 to Leslie Street to the CN Railway to Don Mills Road to the CP Railway to the East Branch of the Don River to East York/North York border the Don Valley Parkway to the Don River to Millwood Road to the CP Railway to the East York/North York border to the Old Toronto city limits to Broadway Avenue to Yonge Street.

In 2007 the southern border was altered so that it continues to follow the East Branch of the Don River to the main branch until Pottery Road to Bayview Avenue until the CP railway.

This riding lost significant territory to Don Valley East and gained territory from St. Paul's during the 2012 electoral redistribution.

Members of Provincial Parliament

Election results

2007 electoral reform referendum

References

External links
Elections Ontario Past Election Results
Map of riding for 2018 election

Ontario provincial electoral districts
Provincial electoral districts of Toronto